Skogan Peak is a  mountain summit located in Kananaskis Country in the Canadian Rockies of Alberta, Canada. Skogan Peak's nearest higher peak is Wind Mountain,  to the southwest. Skogan Peak can be seen from Highway 40 north of the Kananaskis Village area, and from the Barrier Lake area.

Geology

Skogan Peak is composed of sedimentary rock laid down during the Precambrian to Jurassic periods. Formed in shallow seas, this sedimentary rock was pushed east and over the top of younger rock during the Laramide orogeny.

Climate

Based on the Köppen climate classification, Skogan Peak is located in a subarctic climate zone with cold, snowy winters, and mild summers. Winter temperatures can drop below −20 °C with wind chill factors below −30 °C. Precipitation runoff from the mountain drains into tributaries of the Bow River.

See also
Geography of Alberta
Geology of Alberta
List of mountains in the Canadian Rockies

References

Gallery

Two-thousanders of Alberta
Canadian Rockies
Alberta's Rockies